The Sudan national football team represents Sudan in international football and is controlled by the Sudan Football Association, the governing body for football in Sudan. Its home ground is Khartoum Stadium in the capital Khartoum. In 1957, it was one of the three teams to participate in the inaugural Africa Cup of Nations, the other two being Egypt and Ethiopia.

Sudan is one of the oldest teams in Africa and won the 1970 Africa Cup of Nations as hosts.

History

Beginning and an African giant (1946–1970)
The Sudan Football Association was founded in 1936 and thus it became one of the oldest football associations to exist in Africa. However, before the foundation of the Football Association, Sudan had started experiencing football brought to the country by the British colonizers since early 20th century via Egypt. Other Sudanese clubs founded at that time include Al-Hilal Omdurman, Al-Merrikh, which led to popularization of football in the country. The Khartoum League became the first national league to be played in Sudan, laying ground for the future development of Sudanese football.

Being experienced early with football, Sudan was quick to affiliate itself with FIFA in 1948, and soon after, Sudanese officials were instrumental, along with Ethiopian, South African and Egyptian counterparts, forming the Confederation of African Football in the Sudanese capital of Khartoum in 1957. Following the establishment of CAF, Sudan participated in the 1957 African Cup of Nations, the first historic Africa Cup of Nations which Sudan was host. The national team finished third, as South Africa was banned over apartheid.

During that early era, Sudan produced some of the finest players, most notably Mustafa Azhari, the captain of Sudan during this period; Nasr El-Din Abbas, who became Sudan's top scorer in the country's football team; Siddiq Manzul, who was an instrumental leader in Sudan's forward; Ali Gagarin with his meteoric ability. Sudan then won the 1970 African Cup of Nations, their only African trophy up to date.

Decline (1970–2008)
With the retirement of a significant number of Sudanese football star at the time, the national team of Sudan deteriorated. Sudan participated in 1972 and 1976 editions, but Sudan wasn't able to get out of the group stage. At the time, Sudan was plagued by the first and second civil wars that led to football in the country being largely unable to retain its status. Likewise, Sudan also suffered from series of political upheavals that drained the country's football resources. As such, Sudan struggled to qualify for another AFCON, and the country has yet to qualify for a single FIFA World Cup. Only Libya being the other major Arab country in Africa to have never achieved the feat. Often Sudan participated in AFCON qualification and majority finished in bottom or near bottom of their qualification. This was totally contrasted to their successes in club competition, as Sudanese clubs were omnipresent in CAF Champions League.

Small resurgence (2008–2012)
On 9 September 2007, Sudan beat World Cup participant Tunisia 3–2 at home, making Sudan the top finisher in the 2008 Africa Cup of Nations qualification Group 4. This meant Sudan had finally returned to the AFCON after 32 years. In the 2008 Africa Cup of Nations, their first in 32 years, Sudan was grouped in group C, which they shared with Egypt, Cameroon and Zambia. Sudan lost all three competitive games finishing at the bottom of their group.

Sudan reached the final round of the 2010 World Cup qualifiers but finished last with only a point, failing to reach AFCON and World Cup.

Sudan (as hosts) automatically qualified for the 2011 African Nations Championship. They finished top of their group which consisted of Algeria, Uganda and Gabon to then advance to the knockout stages. After defeating Niger on penalties in the quarterfinals, they lost against Angola in the semifinals (also on penalties) to then win 1–0 against former groupmates Algeria (who also lost on penalties in the semifinals) and finish third in the Championship, their first top 4 finish in a major African tournament since 1970.

In the 2012 Africa Cup of Nations qualification, Sudan was once again in the same group with Ghana, alongside Swaziland and Congo. Sudan lost only one game and reached the tournament In the 2012 Africa Cup of Nations, in group B, Sudan finished second behind Ivory Coast, and overcame Angola by goal difference to reach the knockout stage for the first time since 1970. Sudan played Zambia in the last eight, and lost 0–3. Zambia would go on to win the tournament for the first time.

Downfall (2012–2018)
In 2013 Africa Cup of Nations qualification, Sudan suffered a huge blow when they lost to neighbor Ethiopia by away goal, losing 0–2 in Addis Ababa after a very eventful 5–3 win at home, thus missed out the competition. Since then, Sudan continued to struggle qualifying for the African Cup of Nations for the next 7 years. They also had no success qualifying for the African Nations Championship after their 3rd-place finish in 2011 for a while until 2018.

Fluctuation (2018–present)
In 2018 they qualified for the 2018 African Nations Championship after failing to do so in two previous competitions and finished 3rd place, and it was seen as a signal heralding a new era of Sudanese football. Shortly after, with an almost identical crop of players, Sudan succeeded in qualifying for the 2021 Africa Cup of Nations, finishing ahead of powerhouse South Africa, including two famous wins at home against Ghana and South Africa and eliminated the South Africans in process, successfully returned to the AFCON after nine years. The optimism increased when Sudan beat Libya 1–0 in the qualification for the 2021 FIFA Arab Cup, under the same management of French coach Hubert Velud, making impressions that Sudan would soon recover its glorious place among Arab and African football nations.

However, Sudan has a disastrous opening during the 2022 FIFA World Cup qualification. Being drawn with the likes of a fellow Arab state and powerhouse Morocco, as well as Guinea-Bissau and Guinea which have never taken part in a World Cup like Sudan, the Sudanese were still being regarded as somewhat better than the two Guineas and could be a potential competitor against Morocco. Sudan started its quest with a 0–2 away to the Moroccans in Rabat, which was seen as acceptable. Yet in the home fixture against Guinea-Bissau, Sudan was completely trashed by the Bissau-Guineans 2–4, to leave the team in the bottom place and reducing hopes to qualify for a maiden World Cup. Sudan's hope was completely dashed after winning only two points after two consecutive draws over Guinea, effectively making Sudan the first team to be eliminated in the group.

Team image

Recent results and fixtures

2022

2023

Coaching history

 Saleh Rajab (1956)
 Jozsef Hada (1957–1959)
 Lozan Kotsev (1959–1964)
 Jiří Starosta (1964–1968)
 Muhamed Hassan Kheiri (1968–1970)
 Abdel Fatah Hemed (1970–1974)
 Ivan Yanko (1974–1976)
 Ebrahim Kabir (1976–1978)
 Burkhard Ziese (1978–1980)
 Muhamed Mazda (1996)
 Nasreldin Jaksa (1996)
 Sharafeldin Musa (1998)
 Muhamed Mahmoud (1999)
 Fawzi Almardi (2000)
 Zoran Đorđević (2000)
 Ahmed Babeker (2000-2002) 
 Wojciech Lazarek (2002–2004)
 Muhamed Mazda (2005-2008)
 Stephen Constantine (2009–2010)
 Ahmed Babeker (2010)
 Muhamed Mazda (2010–2015)
 Ahmed Babeker (2015)
 Hamdan Hemed (2016)
 Muhamed Mazda (2016)
 Zdravko Logarušić (2017–2019)
 Khaled Bakhit (2020)
 Hubert Velud (2020–2021)
 Burhan Tia (2021–2023)
 Ezzaki Badou (2023-)

Players

Current squad
The following players were called up for the 2023 Africa Cup of Nations qualification Group I matches against Gabon, on 23, 27 March 2023.

Caps and goals are correct as of 23 January 2023, after the match against Madagascar.

|caps=0|goals=0|club=Alamal SC Atbara|clubnat=SDN}}

|caps=0|goals=0|club=Al-Hilal ESC (Al-Fasher)|clubnat=SDN}}

Recent call-ups
The following players have been called up for Sudan in the last 12 months.

Notes
INJ = Withdrew due to injury
PRE = Preliminary squad / standby
RET = Retired from the national team

Records
.
Players in bold are still active with Sudan.

Most appearances

Top goalscorers

Competitive record

FIFA World Cup record

Olympic Games record

Football at the Summer Olympics has been an under-23 tournament since the 1992 edition.

Africa Cup of Nations record

African Games record

 Prior to the Cairo 1991 campaign, the Football at the All-Africa Games was open to full senior national teams.

African Nations Championship record

CECAFA Cup record

Arab Cup record

Pan Arab Games record

Honours

 Africa Cup of Nations
 Champion (1): 1970
 Runners-up (2): 1959, 1963
 Third place (1): 1957
 CECAFA Cup
 Champion (3): 1980, 2006, 2007
 Runners-up (2): 1990, 2013
 Third place (3): 1996, 2004, 2011
 Pan Arab Games
 Runners-up (1): 1965

References

External links

 Sudan Football Association – الاتحاد السوداني لكرة القدم
 Sudan at FIFA.com
 Sudan national football team image

 
African national association football teams
S